Amdoparvovirus is a genus of viruses in the family Parvoviridae in the subfamily Parvovirinae. Mustelids (minks, ferrets, and foxes), skunk, and  raccoons serve as natural hosts. There are five species in this genus. Diseases associated with this genus include progressive disorder of immune system.

Taxonomy
The following five species are assigned to the genus:

Carnivore amdoparvovirus 1
Carnivore amdoparvovirus 2
Carnivore amdoparvovirus 3
Carnivore amdoparvovirus 4
Carnivore amdoparvovirus 5

Structure 
Viruses in the genus Amdoparvovirus have non-enveloped protein particles with T=1 icosahedral symmetry. They are around 18 to 26 nm in diameter and contain a single linear single-stranded DNA genome around 4.8 kb in length.

Life cycle
Viral replication is nuclear. Entry into the host cell is achieved by attachment to host receptors, which mediate clathrin-mediated endocytosis. Replication follows the rolling-hairpin model. DNA templated transcription, with some alternative splicing mechanism is the method of transcription. The virus may exit the host cell by vesicular trafficking following nuclear pore export or be released following cell lysis.
Mustelids, skunk, and raccoons serve as the natural host. Transmission routes are oral and respiratory.

References

External links 
 
 

Parvovirinae
Virus genera